The George M. Miles House is a site on the National Register of Historic Places located in Miles City, Montana, United States.  It was added to the Register on February 17, 1982.  George M. Miles was the nephew of General Nelson A. Miles.  He was a bank president and owner of a local hardware store.

It is a two-story irregularly massed Queen Anne-style house.  In 1980 juniper trees obscured the front of the house.

It was home of George M. Miles from 1899 to 1913.  Miles was involved in various businesses, including serving as president of the First National Bank from 1907 to 1929.

References

Houses in Custer County, Montana
Houses on the National Register of Historic Places in Montana
Buildings and structures in Miles City, Montana
National Register of Historic Places in Custer County, Montana
Houses completed in 1897
Queen Anne architecture in Montana